Indo-Trinidadians and Tobagonians or  Indian-Trinidadians and Tobagonians, are people of Indian origin who are nationals of Trinidad and Tobago whose ancestors came from India and the wider subcontinent beginning in 1845.

Indo-Trinidadians and Tobagonians are a subgroup of Indo-Caribbeans, which is a subgroup of the wider Indian diaspora. Generally, most Indians in Trinidad and Tobago can trace their ancestry back to northern India, especially the Bhojpur and Awadh regions of the Hindi Belt, which lies in the Gangetic plains, a plain that is located between the Ganga and Yamuna rivers and faces the mountain ranges of the Himalayas and the Vindhyas. However, some Indians may trace their ancestry to other parts of South Asia, notably southern India. Indians first arrived in Trinidad and Tobago as indentured laborers from India through the Indian indenture system from 1845 till 1917, and some Indians and other South Asians, along with their families, later came as entrepreneurs, businesspeople, religious leaders, doctors, engineers, and other professional occupations beginning in the mid-20th century and continuing till present day. Some Indians from other Caribbean nations also immigrated to Trinidad and Tobago.

Indo-Trinidadians and Tobagonians are the largest ethnic group in Trinidad and Tobago, identified by the official census, about 35.43% of the population in 2011.

History

In his book Perspectives on the Caribbean: A Reader In Culture, History, and Representation, Philip W. Scher cites figures by Steven Vertovec, Professor of Anthropology; Of 94,135 Indian immigrants to Trinidad, between 1874 and 1917, 50.7 percent were from the North-Western Provinces, 24.4 percent hailed from Oudh State, 13.5 percent were from Bihar Province and lesser numbers from various other parts of the British Raj, such as the Madras Presidency, Bengal Presidency, Central Provinces, Chota Nagpur Division, Bombay Presidency, and Punjab Province. Out of 134,118 indentured labourers from India, 5,000 who left from the Port of Madras distinguished themselves as "Madrasi" and the immigrants who left from the Port of Calcutta distinguished themselves as "Kalakatiyas". However, this did not equate to their ethnolinguistic group. While, most Indians who left from the Port of Madras were Tamils (Madrasis), not all were ethnic-Madrasis, some were Telugu, Kannadiga, Malayali, or Tulu, and most Indians who left from the Port of Calcutta were not ethnic-Bengalis (Kalakatiyas), but they were Purabias (Bhojpuri and Awadhi), however there were small numbers of Bengalis, as well as small numbers of  Maithils, Magahis, Baghelis, Brajis, Bundelis, Kannaujis, Kauravis,  Pashtuns, Nagpuris, Kurukhs, Haryanvis, Gujaratis, Marwari, Sadans, Chhattisgarhis, Kashmiris, Dogras, Punjabis, Marathis, Odias, Garhwalis, Kumaonis, Madheshis, Parsees, Assamese, Newars, Tharus and Khas who came via the Port of Calcutta.

Many were people who were escaping poverty in India and seeking employment offered by the British for jobs either as indentured labourers, workers or educated servicemen, primarily, between 1845 and 1917.

The demand for Indian indentured labourers increased dramatically after the abolition of slavery in 1834. They were sent, sometimes in large numbers, to plantation colonies producing high-value crops such as sugar in Africa and the Caribbean.

Religion

According to the most recent census (2011) conducted in Trinidad and Tobago, Hinduism is the religion followed by a plurality of Indo-Trinidadians. The breakdown of religious affiliation for Indo-Trinidadians is as follows - 
 Hinduism - 49.54%
 Islam - 11.64%
Pentecostalism/Evangelicalism/Full Gospel - 9.67%
 Roman Catholicism - 6.48%
 Not Stated - 6.30%
 Other - 5.81%
 Presbyterianism/Congregationalism - 5.68%
 None - 1.04%
 Spiritual Baptist - 0.96% 
 Seventh-day Adventist Church - 0.91%
 Jehovah's Witnesses - 0.73%
 Anglicanism - 0.56%
 Trinidad Orisha - 0.31%
 Other Baptists - 0.21%
 Sikhism - 0.06%
 Methodism - 0.05%
 Rastafari - 0.02%
 Moravian Church - 0.007%

Hindus in Trinidad and Tobago are represented by several sects, organizations and entities the largest of which is the Sanatan Dharma Maha Sabha, a Sanātanī Hindu organization. Other Hindu organizations and sects include SWAHA International, Arya Samaj, Chinmaya Mission, Kabir panth, ISKCON, the Sathya Sai Baba movement, Shirdi Sai Baba movement, Ramanandi Sampradaya, Seunariani (Sieunarini/Siewnaraini/Shiv Narayani), Aughar (Aghor/Owghur), Kali Mai (Madrasi), Murugan (Kaumaram), Bharat Sevashram Sangha, Jagadguru Kripalu Parishat (Radha Madhav), Ganapathi Sachchidananda movement, Divine Life Society, Brahma Kumaris, and Blue Star.

A majority of Indo-Trinidadian and Tobagonian Muslims are Sunni, however there are notable Shia and Ahmadiyya minorities. The major Muslim organisation representing Muslims in Trinidad and Tobago is the Anjuman Sunnat-ul-Jamaat Association (ASJA). Other Islamic organizations include the Trinidad Muslim League, Darul Uloom, Ummah T&T, the Muslim Federation, and the Tackveeyatul Islamic Association.

The Sikh community in Trinidad and Tobago, numbering at about 300, consists of the descendants of the few Punjabis who came during the indentureship period, Punjabi Sikhs who came in the twentieth and twenty-first century, and Sindhi Hindus and  Punjabi Hindus who also came in the twentieth and twenty-first century and who are, in addition to being Hindu, Nanakpanthis, followers of the Sikh Guru Nanak. The Sikhs have a gurdwara (temple) in Tunapuna dating back to 1929.

Politics

Most Indo-Trinidadians have traditionally given their political support to parties opposed to the People's National Movement (PNM) which has historically been perceived as a Christian African-Creole party. Voting patterns amongst Indo-Trinidadians have also been influenced by religion where, for periods of time Muslim Indo-Trinidadians and non-Presbyterian Christian Indo-Trinidadians supported the PNM because the prevailing parties for Indo-Trinidadians – the PDP, DLP, and ULF were felt to be Hindu and Presbyterian Indian dominated parties. With the advent of the NAR and then the UNC this polarization by religion has been on the decline however its existence is still felt with the UNC fielding a Muslim candidate in every election for the San Juan/Barataria seat since 1995 owing to the presence of a large Indo-Trinidadian Muslim population within this constituency.

Notable Indo-Trinidadian politicians include:
Basdeo Panday - 1st Prime Minister of Indo-Trinidadian descent
Kamla Persad-Bissesar - 1st Female Prime Minister of Trinidad and Tobago
Rudranath Capildeo - Leader of the Opposition at the time of independence
Bhadase Sagan Maraj - Leader of the Parliamentary wing (1958–1960)
Ashford Sinanan - Opposition leader (1951-1956); West Indies Federation Opposition Leader (1958–1961)
Rudranath Capildeo - party leader (1960–1969)
Stephen Carpoondeo Maharaj - acting Opposition leader (1963–1965)
Simbhoonath Capildeo - Opposition leader (1965)
Vernon Jamadar - Opposition leader (1965–1972); party leader (1969–1972)
Noor Mohamed Hassanali - first Muslim Head of State in the Western Hemisphere and the first Muslim and Indian to hold the office of President of Trinidad and Tobago (1987-1997)
Adrian Cola Rienzi - Mayor of San Fernando and Member of the Legislative Council for Victoria (1937-1944)
Raffique Shah - Opposition leader (1977-1978)
Winston Dookeran - UNC party leader (2005-2006); COP party leader (2006-2011)
Sarran Teelucksingh - Member of the Legislative Council for Caroni (1925-1946); first Indian elected to the Legislative Council, a predecessor of the Parliament of Trinidad and Tobgao
Isaac Hyatali - first Chief Justice of Trinidad and Tobago of Indo-Trinidadian descent
Satnarine Sharma - first Hindu Chief Justice of Trinidad and Tobago

Culture
Indo–Trinidadian and Tobagonians have retained their distinctive heritage and culture, while also functioning in a multi-racial manner. The South Asian languages of their ancestors have largely been lost, although a number of these words have entered the Trinidadian vernacular. Indian movies, Indian music, and Indian cuisine have entered the mainstream culture of Trinidad and Tobago. Chutney music and chutney soca rivals calypso and soca music during the Carnival season.

Holidays and Festivals
Divali, Eid ul-Fitr, and Indian Arrival Day are national holidays, and Phagwah/ Holi, Maha Shivratri, Hanuman Jayanti, Ram Naumi, Sita Naumi, Navratri, Vijayadashami, Krishna Janmashtami, Radhastami, Saraswati Jayanti, Raksha Bandhan, Vivaha Panchami, Guru Purnima, Ganesh Chaturthi, Kartik Snan, Ratha Saptami, Kalbhairo Jayanti, Mesha Sankranti, Makar Sankranti, Chhath, Tulsi Vivah, Gita Jayanti, Ratha Yatra, Ramadan, Hosay (Ashura), Eid al-Adha, Mawlid, Shab-e-barat, Islamic New Year, and other Hindu and Muslim holidays are widely celebrated.

Cuisine

Breakfast
A traditional Indo-Trinidadian and Tobagonian breakfast consists of sada roti, a type of unleavened bread made with flour, baking powder and water. The dough is rolled out and cooked on flat, cast-iron skillet, called a tawa. The cooked dough is cut into quarters and served with a variety of fried vegetables, tarkaris or chokhas. Sometimes fried bake is eaten instead and is made using with flour, baking powder and yeast and is then fried in oil. Usually breakfast is vegetarian, however salt fish is sometimes added. Some breakfast dishes include baigan chokha (roasted and mashed eggplant), damadol chokha (roasted and mashed tomatoes), pepper chokha (roasted and mashed peppers), aloo chokha (boiled, roasted, and mashed potatoes), karaili chokha (roasted and mashed bittermelon), murtani or upar ghar (combination of roasted and mashed eggplant, tomato, pepper, and okra), fried or curried bodi (long beans), fried or curried aloo (potatoes), fried or curried ochro/bhindhi (okra), fried or curried seim (hyacinth beans), fried or curried karaili (bittermelon), pumpkin or kohra  tarkari (pumpkin simmered with spices and seasoning), fried or curried saijan (drumstick), fried or curried lauki (bottle gourd), bhaji (made with young dasheen bush (taro) leaves, spinach leaves, saijan (drumstick) leaves, or chaurai (spiny amaranth) leaves), and/or fried plantains.

Street foods

Indo-Trinidadian and Tobagonian foods like doubles, aloo pie, pholourie, saheena, baiganee, bara, and kachori are popular street foods throughout the country and are served with various chutneys, achars, and pepper sauce. Doubles is made with two baras (flat fried dough) and curried channa (chickpeas) and is served with toppings, like pepper sauce, kuchela, and tamarind, mango, pommecythere, cucumber, coconut and bandhaniya chutneys. It is one of the most popular breakfast foods eaten on the islands, however, it is eaten at any time throughout the day. Another Indo-Trinidadian and Tobagonian street food that is popular is wrap roti, which consists of roti (usually paratha or dhalpuri) that wraps curried vegetables, curried channa (chickpeas) and aloo (potatoes), curried chicken, curried shrimp, curried goat, curried duck, curried conchs, or any other spicy fillings. The town of Debe in southern Trinidad is a popular destination for these street foods.

Festival foods

Traditional Diwali and other Hindu festivals and prayers foods include appetizers such as pholourie, saheena, baiganee, bara, and kachori. Main dishes include roti (most commonly dalpuri and paratha) and  karhi and rice served with condiments such as achar or anchar, kuchela, mother-in-law (pickled vegetables), pepper sauce, and dishes such as curried mango, bhaji (dasheen bush or any spinach), pumpkin or kohra tarkari (pumpkin), curry channa and aloo (chickpeas and potatoes), fried or curried baigan (eggplant), fried or curried bodi (long beans), fried or curried seim (hyacinth beans), curry eddoes (arui), curry chataigne or katahar (breadnut), and other tarkaries (vegetarian curries). Desserts include mohan bhog (parsad), lapsi and suhari, burfi, khurma, gulab jamun, pera, rasgulla, batasa, gujiya, gulgula, roat, kheer (sweet rice), laddu, and jalebi. It is traditionally served on a sohari (Calathea lutea) leaf.

Special Eid, Hosay, and other Muslim festival foods include curry goat, curry channa and aloo, sawine, burfi, rasgulla, sirnee, maleeda, and halwa.

Condiments

Indo-Trinidadians and Tobagonians accompany their meals with various condiments; these can include pepper sauces, chutneys and pickles and are often homemade.

Pepper sauces are made by using scotch bonnet or other hot peppers, either minced or chopped and added to vinegar or lime or lemon juice and sometimes pickled together with carrots, sour cherries, bitter melon, or daikon (murai). Mother-in-law is another popular condiment which is a coarsely chopped spicy medley of peppers, pimentos, carrots, bitter melon, and other spices.

Chutneys are popular as well and often include mango, tamarind, cucumber, pommecythère, bandhaniya, dhaniya, chalta, and coconut. They are most commonly eaten with doubles, aloo pie, saheena, baiganee, kachori, and pholourie. There are a variety of popular pickles known locally as achar or anchar which are commonly used. Kuchela a grated spicy version, usually made from mango but sometimes made from pommecythère, the mango version being most popular. Other version of achars are made from mango, pommecythère, tamarind, amla, lemon, lime, chayote, chalta, and green apple.

Sweets and Desserts
Indian sweets and dessers are commonplace in Trinidad and Tobago and are distributed especially at Indian weddings and religious events. They include kheer (sweet rice or meetha bhat), sawine, khurma, gulab jamoon, burfi, roat, laddu, jalebi, halwa, mohan bhog (parsad), sirnee, lapsi and suhari, rasgula, tilly cake, gulgula, paynuse, pera, modak, gujiya, and batasa.

Dance
Indian dance forms are prevalent among Indo-Trinidadian and Tobagonians. Kathak, Odissi, and Bharatanatyam are the most popular Indian classical dance forms in Trinidad and Tobago. Indian folk dances, Bollywood dancing, and chutney dancing are also popular Indian dance forms.

Theatre
Indian theatre is also popular throughout Trinidad and Tobago. Nautankis and dramas such as Raja Harishchandra, Raja Nal, Raja Rasalu, Sarwaneer (Sharwan Kumar), Indra Sabha, Bhakt Prahalad, Lorikayan, Gopichand, and Alha-Khand were brought by Indians to Trinidad and Tobago, however they had largely began to die out, till preservation began by Indian cultural groups. Ramleela, the drama about the life of the Hindu deity Rama, is largely popular throughout the country during the time between Sharad Navaratri and Vijayadashami leading up to Diwali, with almost each locale having their own celebration. The Ramlila celebrations end with the burning of an effigy of Ravana, the main antagonist of the ancient Ramayana and its 16th century vernacular variation, popular among Hindus in Trinidad and Tobago, the Ramcharitmanas. Rasleela (Krishnaleela), the drama about the life of the Hindu deity Krishna, is popular around the time of Krishna Janmashtami.

Influence on Trinidad and Tobago
The Indian–South Asian influence is very much noticeable in Trinidad and Tobago as they are the largest ethnic groups in the country. Mandirs, masijids, jhandis (Hindu prayer flags), Hindu schools, Muslim schools, roti shops and stalls, puja stores, Indian groceries/markets, and Indian clothing stores and expos dot the landscape of the country. Many businesses also bear names of Indian-South Asian origin. Many towns, settlements, villages, avenues, traces, and streets in Trinidad and Tobago are named after Indian cities and people, such as Calcutta Settlement, Madras Settlement, Delhi Settlement, Jai Ramkissoon Housing Settlement, Raghoo Village, Jaraysingh, Hasnalli, Hindustan Village, Patna Village, Gandhi Village, Kandahar Village, Cawnpore (Kanpur) Village, Nepal Village, Abdul Village, Samaroo Village, Basta Hall, Gopaul Lands, Sumadh Gardens, Mohammed Ville, Nancoo Village, Malabar, Matura (Mathura), Bangladesh, Morang Village, Chandanagore (Chandinagar), Sadhoowa, Divali Nagar, Golconda, Barrackpore, and Fyzabad. The holidays of Diwali, Eid al-Fitr, and Indian Arrival Day are national holidays in Trinidad and Tobago. Trinidadian Hindustani and other South Asian languages has had a great influence on the Trinidadian English lingua franca. Most people of South Asian descent in Trinidad and Tobago also speak a unique Hinglish macaronic dialect of Trinidadian English and Trinidadian Hindustani and they incorporate more Hindustani vocabulary into their Trinidadian English dialect than other ethnic groups in the country.

Notable persons

See also

 Chutney music
 Chutney soca
 History of Trinidad and Tobago
 Indian Arrival Day
 Indian indenture system
 Indo-Caribbean
 Indo-Caribbean music
 Indo-Guyanese
 Indo-Surinamese
 Pichakaree
 India–Trinidad and Tobago relations

Footnotes

References

External links

 
 
Ethnic groups in Trinidad and Tobago
Human migration
India–Trinidad and Tobago relations
Indo-Caribbean